is a Japanese football player who played for Kochi United SC of the Shikoku Soccer League, scoring 49 goals in 3 seasons.

Club statistics
Updated to 20 February 2016.

References

External links

1985 births
Living people
Kokushikan University alumni
Association football people from Hokkaido
Japanese footballers
J2 League players
Japan Football League players
Tokushima Vortis players
Iwate Grulla Morioka players
MIO Biwako Shiga players
Zweigen Kanazawa players
FC Osaka players
Kochi United SC players
Association football forwards
People from Muroran, Hokkaido